Pagale Vennela is a 2007 Telugu movie that is directed by C.V.Reddi. Siva Balaji plays the lead role. The film released on 26 January 2007.

Cast

 Siva Balaji as Balu 
 Mythili as Swapna 
 Jayaprakash Reddy 
 Sunil
 Dharmavarapu Subramanyam
 Brahmanandam
 Kovai Sarala as Sarala 
 Tanikella Bharani as Swapna's father
 Sana as Swapna's mother
 Raghu Babu as Bosubabu 
 Mallikarjuna Rao
 M. S. Narayana
 Mada Venkateswara Rao
 Venu Madhav
 Kondavalasa Lakshmana Rao
 Apoorva

Music
Music composed by Vandemataram Srinivas.

References

External links

2007 films
2000s Telugu-language films